Henry Ward VC (1823 – 12 September 1867) was an English soldier and a recipient of the Victoria Cross, the highest and most prestigious award for gallantry in the face of the enemy that can be awarded to British and Commonwealth forces.  He was born in Harleston, Norfolk, and died in Malvern, Worcestershire.

Details

Ward was approximately 34 years old, and a private in the 78th Regiment of Foot (later The Seaforth Highlanders Ross-shire Buffs, Duke of Albany's), British Army during the Indian Mutiny when the following deed took place on 25 and 26 September 1857 in Lucknow, British India, for which he was awarded the VC:

Ward later became the personal servant of Sir Henry Havelock whose life was saved by Ward in his VC action and later achieved the rank of quartermaster-sergeant. His Victoria Cross is displayed at the Regimental Museum of Queens Own Highlanders in Fort George, Inverness-shire, Scotland.
Ward was buried in a pauper's grave in Malvern, Worcestershire. By 2014, his grave was in a poor state of repair and the local council proposed to repair in association with the Victoria Cross Trust.

References

Monuments to Courage (David Harvey, 1999)
The Register of the Victoria Cross (This England, 1997)

External links
Location of grave and VC medal (Worcestershire)
 News report on his biography
 News report on plan to repair the grave marker

1823 births
1867 deaths
People from Redenhall with Harleston
Seaforth Highlanders soldiers
British recipients of the Victoria Cross
Indian Rebellion of 1857 recipients of the Victoria Cross
British military personnel of the Anglo-Persian War
British Army recipients of the Victoria Cross